Dhanyamalini, also referred to as Dhanyamala and Dhanyamali, is the second wife of Ravana, the antagonist of the Hindu epic Ramayana. She appears rarely in the epic and is famous as the mother of Atikaya. However, in Ramavataram—a regional version of the epic—she is childless who fostered Atikaya as her own son. In some other versions of the Ramayana, Dhanyamali had four sons from Ravana — Atikaya, Narantaka, Devantaka, and Trishira.

References

Women in Hindu mythology

th:นางกาลอัคคีนาคราช